Pavel Košťál (born 17 September 1980 in Hradec Králové) is a Czech footballer who is currently plays as a defender in Sokol Živanice. He is known for his strength and ability in the air.

References

External links 
 
 Guardian Football

1980 births
Living people
Sportspeople from Hradec Králové
Czech footballers
Czech expatriate footballers
Association football defenders
Czech First League players
2. Bundesliga players
Slovak Super Liga players
Czech National Football League players
Bohemian Football League players
FC Slovan Liberec players
FC Hradec Králové players
FC Hansa Rostock players
FC Zbrojovka Brno players
FK Senica players
MFK Karviná players
FK Viktoria Žižkov players
TJ Sokol Živanice players
Expatriate footballers in Austria
Czech expatriate sportspeople in Austria
Expatriate footballers in Germany
Czech expatriate sportspeople in Germany
Expatriate footballers in Slovakia
Czech expatriate sportspeople in Slovakia